Eric Thibault (born August 22, 1987) is an American basketball head coach for the Washington Mystics of the WNBA. Thibault was previously an assistant coach for the Mystics since the 2013 season.

College
Thibault attended the University of Missouri for his undergraduate English degree and was a member of the Missouri Tiger women's basketball team practice squad during his time. After spending three seasons as a practice player, Thibault moved into a graduate assistant role with the Tigers.

Following one year as a graduate assistant at Missouri, the coaching staff there was let go and Thibault found another graduate assistant opportunity with Kim Barnes Arico and the St. John's Red Storm women's basketball team.

Coaching career
Following his years as a graduate assistant, Thibault got his first assistant coaching job with the VCU Rams women's basketball team. Thibault only spent one year there before he left to go the WNBA coaching ranks.

Thibault was named an assistant coach on the Washington Mystics staff in May of 2013. Prior to the 2019 season, the Mystics promoted him to Associate Head Coach, a position that he held until the end of the 2022 season.

Washington Mystics
Thibault was promoted to the Mystics Head Coach in November of 2022, following the coaching retirement of his father and previous Mystics Head Coach Mike Thibault.

Personal life
Thibault's father is Mike Thibault, who has coached in both the NBA and the WNBA for numerous years. Mike is currently the Washington Mystics General Manager. His sister is Carly Thibault-DuDonis, who is currently the head coach for the Fairfield Stags women's basketball team.

Eric is married to his wife, Andreya, and they are expecting their first child in 2023.

References

External links

1987 births
Living people
American women's basketball coaches
Category:VCU Rams women's basketball coaches
Washington Mystics coaches